Cobitis minamorii is a species of fish in the family Cobitidae found in the rivers flowing into Seto Inland Sea, San'yō district, western Honshu: Okayama and Hiroshima Prefectures in Japan.

Subspecies
There are currently 5 recognized subspecies:
 Cobitis minamorii minamorii Nakajima, 2012 
 Cobitis minamorii oumiensis Nakajima, 2012 
 Cobitis minamorii saninensis Nakajima, 2012 
 Cobitis minamorii tokaiensis Nakajima, 2012 
 Cobitis minamorii yodoensis Nakajima, 2012

References

Fish described in 2012
Endemic fauna of Japan
minamorii